Ottawa Hills Public Schools is a school district in Northwest Ohio. The school district serves students who live in the village of Ottawa Hills, in Lucas County. The superintendent is Kevin Miller.

Grades 9-12
Ottawa Hills High School

Grades 7-8
Ottawa Hills Junior High School

K-6
Ottawa Hills Elementary

Parochial School(s) within the District
 Notre Dame (Female Only Catholic School educating grades 9-12)

External links
District Website

School districts in Ohio
Education in Lucas County, Ohio